New Life Fellowship Association, commonly known as New Life Fellowship (NLF), is a group of megachurches primarily located in India, that is characterised by adherence to the Holiness movement, Evangelicalism, and Biblical fundamentalism. New Life Fellowship Association Mumbai (Bombay) is a megachurch with 70,000 members.

History
New Life Fellowship was founded in 1964 in Pune by missionaries  Graham and Pamela Truscott from the New Life Churches of New Zealand. In 1966, the church was established in Mumbai. Dr. S. Joseph joined the Church in Mumbai and was soon ordained Pastor and became the founding chairman of New Life Fellowship. In India, it has more than 100,000 adherents. 
In 2020, the Church had 70,000 people.

Beliefs 
The denomination has a charismatic confession of faith.

Bibliography

Brett Knowles: New Life: The New Life Churches of New Zealand: 1942-1979: Dunedin: Third Millennium: 1999:

See also 
List of the largest evangelical megachurches
Born Again Movement
Christianity in India

References

External links
 New Life Fellowship official site

Charismatic denominations
Evangelicalism in India
Christian organizations established in 1964